Nova Scotia has two major national parks, Cape Breton Highlands National Park and Kejimkujik National Park. Nova Scotia is also home to three UNESCO world heritage sites. The two cultural and one natural site are the town of Old Lunenberg, the Grand-Pré National Historic Site, and the Joggins fossil cliffs. Nova Scotia is also famous for its numerous historical sites, museums, and natural areas.

Halifax 

 Halifax Citadel - A star shaped fort with a view of Halifax Harbour, constructed in 1749 to defend the city.
 Halifax Public Gardens - First planted in 1867, they are among the few surviving Victorian era gardens of Canada.
 Maritime Museum of the Atlantic - Founded in 1948, today it contains over 30,000 artifacts, 70 small craft, and the steam ship CSS Acadia.
 Nova Scotia Museum of Natural History - First established in 1868, this museum's collection includes various historical collections and natural sciences exhibits.

Eastern Shore
See main page: Tourism on the Eastern Shore (Nova Scotia)

Other attractions 

Attractions outside of the Halifax regional municipality include the following:

 Cabot Trail on Cape Breton Island originally constructed in 1932 specifically to re-brand Nova Scotia as a tourism destination.
 Fortress of Louisbourg Originally settled in 1713 and subject to two sieges in the 18th century, it is today operated by Parks Canada as a living history museum.
 Nova Scotia Museum of Industry in Stellarton which houses over 30,000 objects in its collection, and has exhibits on coal mining and the Westray Mine disaster of 1992.
 Shubenacadie Wildlife Park is home to various specimens of wildlife found throughout Canada and beyond, and also includes hiking trails, a picnic area, and a playground.
 Peggy's Cove, a fishing village southwest of Halifax, known for its lighthouse and scenery.

Transportation in Nova Scotia 

Nova Scotia has a highly developed highway system which allows for road transportation between various communities and tourism sites within the province. Maritime Bus provides road transportation to/from Nova Scotia from the neighbouring province of New Brunswick. Marine Atlantic also provides two ferry links to the communities of Argentia and Port aux Basque, both in the province of Newfoundland and Labrador.

Nova Scotia is connected to Montreal by the Ocean, a train operated by Via Rail. It is also connected to the rest of Canada and the world by Halifax Stanfield International Airport.

Nova Scotia Tourism Statistics 

An estimated total of 1,659,000 tourists visited Nova Scotia in the months of January - September 2015, a 6 percent increase over the same period in 2014. This trend reverses a decline in the number of tourists that visited Nova Scotia in 2013, particularly during the off-peak season.

Gallery

References

 
 
 
Nova Scotia-related lists